Tetrakis(1-norbornyl)cobalt(IV) is an air-sensitive organometallic compound of cobalt. It was first synthesized by Barton K. Bower and Howard G. Tennent in 1972 and is one of few compounds in which cobalt has a formal oxidations state of +4.

Preparation 
Tetrakis(1-norbornyl)cobalt(IV) is formed the reaction of CoCl2•THF with 1-norbornyllithium (norLi) in n-pentane under an inert atmosphere. The cobalt(II) chloride-THF adduct is prepared from Soxhlet extraction of anhydrous CoCl2 with THF, and the organolithium reagent is prepared from the reaction between 1-chloro­-norbornane and lithium metal.

{2CoCl2.THF} + 4 norLi ->[\text{pentane}][] {[Co(nor)4]} + {Co} + 4 {LiCl} + 2 THF 

The compound can then be purified by recrystallization.

Properties 
The complex is a thermally stable homoleptic tetraorganylcobalt(IV) complex with exclusively σ-bonding ligands. It was the first low-spin complex with tetrahedral geometry to be isolated.

Stability 
The exceptional stability of the complex is in large part due to its inability to undergo either α- or β-hydride elimination. The α-position of the metal (corresponding to the 1-position of the norbornyl ligand) has no more hydrogen atoms, while hydride elimination from the β-position would yield an energetically unfavorable double bond on a bridgehead atom (Bredt's rule). Moreover, the bulky norbornyl ligands sterically shield the central atom, hindering ligand substitutions as well as homolysis.

The rare d5 low-spin configuration in a tetrahedral ligand field is possible because the ligand is so strongly σ-donating that the gap between the e und t2 orbitals is raised sufficiently to overcome the spin pairing energy. The resulting configuration is e4t21, with magnetic measurements showing paramagnetism consistent with only one unparied electron.

Cobalt(III) and cobalt(V) derivatives 
The reaction between CoCl2•THF and 1-norbornyllithium (norLi) also allows the formation of a cobalt(III) complex: if a mixture of diethyl ether and THF is used as the solvent in place of n-pentane, the resulting disproportionation reaction affords the complex tetrakis(1-norbornyl)cobaltate(III), which crystallizes out of solution with solvated lithium counterions, along with elemental cobalt.

3 {CoCl2.THF} + 8 {norLi} + 5 {THF} ->[{}\atop\ce{Et2O/THF}] 2 {[Li(THF)4][Co(nor)4]} + {Co} + LiCl

The compound is air-sensitive, has a green color and is paramagnetic, with two unpaired electrons, again indicating a low-spin tetrahedral configuration (d6, e4t22).

The corresponding cobalt(V) complex is prepared by oxidizing tetrakis(1-norbornyl)cobalt(IV) with Ag[BF4] in THF and crystallizes with tetrafluoroborate as the counterion.

This complex : is the first cobalt(V) complex to be isolated. Again the configuration is low-spin (d4, e4t20).

References

External link
 

Cobalt compounds
Organometallic compounds
Norbornanes